Buu is a Southern Bantoid language of Cameroon. It is closely related to Mundabli.

"Buu" is a village name.

References

Beboid languages
Languages of Cameroon